McLoughlin Bay is an Arctic waterway in Kitikmeot Region, Nunavut, Canada. It is located on the southeastern corner of the Queen Maud Gulf off Nunavut's mainland.

The bay was photographed by Vilhjalmur Stefansson during his Arctic expeditions.

References

Bays of Kitikmeot Region